Cape Renard is a cape forming the south side of the entrance to Flandres Bay and separating the Danco and Graham Coasts on the west coast of Antarctic Peninsula. Situated on the minor Renard Island just off the north extremity of Kyiv Peninsula, and surmounted by Una's Peaks.  Discovered in 1898 by the Belgian Antarctic Expedition under Gerlache and named by him for Professor A. Renard, a member of the Belgica Commission and of the Belgian Royal Academy.

Azufre Point lies about 3 miles (5 km) southeast.

Maps
 Antarctic Digital Database (ADD). Scale 1:250000 topographic map of Antarctica. Scientific Committee on Antarctic Research (SCAR). Since 1993, regularly upgraded and updated.

See also
 List of lighthouses in Antarctica

References

 Cape Renard. SCAR Composite Gazetteer of Antarctica

Renard
Danco Coast
Graham Coast
Lighthouses in Antarctica